The All-Africa University Games is a regional multi-sport event representing Africa, organized for university athletes by the Federation of Africa University Sports (FASU). The games were first held in 1975 in Accra, Ghana.

History
The FASU All-Africa University Games were first held around the 1974-75 new year period in Accra, Ghana and again at the same time of year in 1978–79 in Nairobi, Kenya. The event was after scheduled to be held in Lusaka, Zambia in 1982, however was cancelled and not re-introduced until 2004 in Nigeria when only a very limited range of men's events were contested.

It was set for a tenth edition in 2020, but this was postponed due to the COVID-19 pandemic.

Editions

See also
Universiade

References

External links
Official website of FASU

Recurring sporting events established in 1975
Student sports competitions
Multi-sport events in Africa